The Painswick Line is a 1951 comedy crime novel by the British writer Henry Cecil. It was his debut novel and introduced the character of the drunken solicitor Mr. Tewkesbury who recurred in many of his stories.

References

Bibliography
 Breen, Jon L. Novel Verdicts: A Guide to Courtroom Fiction. Scarecrow Press, 1999.
 Herbert, Rosemary. Whodunit?: A Who's Who in Crime & Mystery Writing. Oxford University Press, 2003.

1951 British novels
Novels by Henry Cecil
Novels set in London
British comedy novels
1951 debut novels
Chapman & Hall books